The 1972 LPGA Championship was the 18th LPGA Championship, held June 8–11 at Pleasant Valley Country Club in Sutton, Massachusetts, southeast of Worcester.

Kathy Ahern shot a final round 69 (−4) to win her only major title, six strokes ahead of runner-up Jane Blalock. Ahern began the final round with a one-stroke lead over three players; after five straight birdies on the front nine, she had a six-stroke lead and shot even par on the final nine.

Three weeks later, Ahern was a runner-up by a stroke at the U.S. Women's Open at Winged Foot, then won the week after at the George Washington Classic near Philadelphia.

Past champions in the field

Made the cut

Source:

Missed the cut

Source:

Final leaderboard
Sunday, June 11, 1972

Source:

References

External links
Golf Observer leaderboard

LPGA Championship
LPGA Championship
LPGA Championship
Golf in Massachusetts
History of Worcester County, Massachusetts
LPGA Championship
Sports competitions in Massachusetts
Sports in Worcester County, Massachusetts
Sutton, Massachusetts
Tourist attractions in Worcester County, Massachusetts
Women's PGA Championship
Women's sports in Massachusetts